The Kings of Jazz featuring Kenny Davern Live in Concert 1974 is technically a Kenny Davern album, though the ensemble of musicians accompanying him on this recording add just as much as he to the overall output; Davern was not leader here. Included on the recording are artists like Dick Hyman and Pee Wee Erwin, to mention just a few. This is some classic dixieland music with top-notch performers of the medium.

Track listing 
Royal Garden Blues (6:40)     
Wild Man Blues (3:42)     
Rosetta (5:09)     
Medley: Someday You'll Be Sorry/When Did You Leave Heaven? (2:28)     
Sweet Georgia Brown (3:53)     
Black and Tan Fantasy (4:16)     
(Back Home Again in) Indiana (7:57)     
Dear Old Southland (3:52)     
Man I Love (3:21)     
Savoy Blues (8:44)     
Fingerbuster (2:32)     
Buddy Bolden's Blues (2:39)     
Oh, Sister! Ain't That Hot! (3:58)     
Love Is Just Around the Corner (8:57)

Personnel
Kenny Davern - clarinet
Bernie Privin - trumpet
Eddie Hubble - trombone
Cliff Leeman - drums 
Dick Hyman - piano
Pee Wee Erwin - trumpet 
Major Holley - string bass 
Johnny Mince - alto saxophone, clarinet

References

Kenny Davern albums
Dixieland revival albums
Dixieland albums
2003 live albums
Arbors Records live albums